Gene Tsudik is a Distinguished Professor of Computer Science at the University of California, Irvine (UCI). He obtained his PhD in Computer Science from USC in 1991. His PhD advisor was Deborah Estrin. Before coming to UCI in 2000, he was at IBM Zurich Research Laboratory (1991-1996) and USC/ISI (1996-2000). His research interests included many topics in security and applied cryptography. Gene Tsudik is a Fulbright Scholar, Fulbright Specialist (thrice), a fellow of ACM, IEEE, AAAS and IFIP as well as a foreign member of Academia Europaea. From 2009 to 2015 he served as Editor-in-Chief of ACM Transactions on Information and Systems Security (TISSEC), which was 
renamed in 2016 to ACM Transactions on Privacy and Security (TOPS): http://tops.acm.org

Gene Tsudik was named:
 Fellow of the Institute of Electrical and Electronics Engineers (IEEE) in 2013 for contributions to distributed systems security and privacy.
 Fellow of the Association for Computing Machinery (ACM) in 2014 for contributions to Internet security and privacy;
 Foreign Member of Academia Europaea (AE) in 2015 for contributions to Internet security and privacy;
 Fellow of the American Association for the Advancement of Science (AAAS) in 2016 for contributions to security and privacy of the Internet;
 Fellow of the International Federation for Information Processing (IFIP) in 2019 for contributions to security and privacy of the Internet;

References

External links 

 Home Page: http://www.ics.uci.edu/~gts
 Google Scholar: https://scholar.google.com/citations?user=WLvuu74AAAAJ
 DBLP: http://dblp.uni-trier.de/pers/hd/t/Tsudik:Gene
 Patents: https://patents.google.com/?inventor=Gene+Tsudik

University of Southern California alumni
Fellows of the American Association for the Advancement of Science
Fellows of the Association for Computing Machinery
Engineers from California
Fellow Members of the IEEE
Living people
University of California, Irvine faculty
Year of birth missing (living people)